Nasr ibn Ahmad or Nasr II, nicknamed "the Fortunate", was the ruler (amir) of Transoxiana and Khurasan as the head of the Samanid dynasty from 914 to 943. His reign marked the high point of the Samanid dynasty's fortunes. He was the son of Ahmad ibn Isma’il.

Biography

Accession and suppression of revolts
Nasr was the son of Ahmad ibn Isma'il. His father was assassinated on the night of 23 January 914 by his own guards, due to his favouring Arabic-language officials in his court. Nasr thus became emir at the age of eight. Due to his youth, the vizier Abu Abdallah Jayhani undertook the regency. 

Almost immediately a series of revolts broke out within the state, the most serious being the one led by his great-uncle, Ishaq ibn Ahmad, at Samarkand. Ishaq's sons took part in the rebellion; one son, Abu Salih Mansur, took control of Nishapur and several other cities in Khurasan. Eventually, Ishaq was defeated and surrendered to the general Hamuya ibn Ali, while Abu Salih Mansur died in Nishapur. 

Mansur was succeeded by a rebellious general, Husayn ibn Ali al-Marwazi. The general Ahmad ibn Sahl was sent against al-Marwazi, and succeeded in capturing him in 918, only to rise in revolt himself. It was not until late 919 that Ibn Sahl too was defeated by Hamuya ibn Ali.  Ahmad was captured during the battle and imprisoned in Bukhara, where he remained until his death in 920. Apart from a brief uprising by Ilyas, a son of Ishaq ibn Ahmad, at Ferghana in 922, the Samanid realm would enjoy a decade of peace thereafter.

Nasr's ascension however brought instability to the peripheries of the Samanid state. The Abbasids managed to recover Sistan for the last time, while Ray and Tabaristan were taken by the Alid Hasan al-Utrush. Despite being unable to recover the provinces, the Samanids employed numerous local Dailamite and Gilite leaders and remained active in the struggles there. In 921, the Zaydids under the Dailamite general Lili ibn al-Nu'man invaded Khorasan, but were defeated by the Simjurid general Simjur al-Dawati.

Middle reign
In 922, Abu Abdallah Jayhani was removed as prime minister by Nasr; it is not known whether this was on account of his suspected Shi’i beliefs. He was replaced by Abu'l-Fadl al-Bal'ami, who for the most part continued his predecessor's policies. In 928, Asfar ibn Shiruya, a Dailamite military leader, who now served the Samanids, conquered Tabaristan and Ray. One year later, Nasr had his commander Muhammad ibn Ilyas imprisoned after angering him. He was, however, shortly freed after receiving the support of Nasr's vizier Bal'ami and was sent on a campaign in Gurgan.

In 930, a revolt by Nasr's brothers broke out. They proclaimed one of their own, Yahya, as amir. Bal’ami managed to quell the rebellion by turning the brothers against each other. Another Dailamite military leader, Makan ibn Kaki, used this opportunity to seize Tabaristan and Gurgan from the Samanids, and even take possession of Nishapur in western Khurasan. He was, however, forced to abandon these regions one year later, due to the threat that Samanids posed. Makan then returned to Tabaristan, where he was defeated by the Ziyarid Mardavij, who managed to conquer the region. He then took refuge in Khorasan, and was appointed by Nasr as the governor of Kerman.

A threat of mobilization by Nasr in 933 prompted Mardavij, who had become the dominant power in the region, to surrender Gurgan and pay tribute for his possession of Ray. One year later, Nasr sent Makan against Muhammad ibn Ilyas, who had mutinied against the Samanids. Muhammad attempted to gain the support of the Abbasid general Yaqut but failed, was defeated by Makan and forced to flee. Mardavij was assassinated by his Turkic slaves in 935 and was succeeded by his brother Vushmgir.

Makan, after having heard of Mardavij's assassination at the hands of his own Turkic slaves, immediately left Kirman, secured his appointment as governor of Gurgan from Nasr, and with the support of Samanid troops tried to recover Tabaristan. Vushmgir managed to repel the attack and even conquer Gurgan, but Buyid pressure on his western flank forced him to reach a settlement, recognizing Samanid overlordship and ceding Gurgan to Makan. Samanid armies from that point on were heavily involved in protecting the Ziyarids from the Buyids, who were rising in central Persia. In 938, a son of Abu Abdallah Jayhani, Abu Ali Jayhani, was appointed as prime minister, a post he held until 941.

During the same period, relations between Makan and Vushmgir improved to the point where they declared independence from the Samanids. As a result, in 939, Nasr sent a Samanid army under Abu 'Ali Chaghani which attacked Makan at Gurgan. Following a seven-month siege of his capital, Makan was forced to flee to Ray. The Samanid army pursued him, and in a battle fought on 25 December 940 at Iskhabad near Ray, the Samanid forces were victorious. Makan himself was killed by an arrow, and then beheaded by the victors, who sent his head to Nasr in Bukhara.

Conversion to Isma'ilism and death
In the 930s, the Samanid court became the object of persistent conversion efforts by the Isma'ili missionary network under Muhammad ibn Ahmad al-Nasafi. These events are described by later Sunni sources. Traditional accounts are based on the Kitāb al-Fihrist of Ibn al-Nadim and the Siyāsatnāmā of Nizam al-Mulk, but al-Tha'alibi's mirror for princes, the Ādāb al-mulūk, published in 1990, also contains much important information. The three sources are often at odds, and it is difficult to reconcile them.

In  the Isma'ilis succeeded  in converting several high-ranking Samanid officials, including, according to Nizam al-Mulk, Nasr's boon companion Abu Bakr al-Nakhshabi, his private secretary Abu Ash'ath, the inspector of the army Abu Mansur al-Shaghani, the chamberlain Aytash, Hasan Malik, governor of Ilaq, and the chief court steward, Ali Zarrad. With their support, the Isma'ili missionaries succeeded in the conversion of Nasr himself, as well as his vizier, Abu Ali Muhammad al-Jayhani. According to al-Tha'alabi's account, Nasr was ill and afraid of his impending death, and was thus receptive to the Isma'ili teachings. This ushered a period of Isma'ili dominance at the Samanid court, where their missionaries preached openly. An Isma'ili secretary, Abu al-Tayyib al-Mus'abi, even appears to have become vizier in 941/42, succeeding al-Jayhani. His tenure was apparently brief, lasting a few months, but his successor was likely also an Isma'ili. 

These developments caused a reaction among the Sunni establishment, and especially the Samanids' Turkic soldiery. According to the story as relayed by Nizam al-Mulk, they began to conspire for a coup, even going as far as offering the throne to one of their commanders. According to Nizam al-Mulk, the Emir's son, Nuh I, got wind of the conspiracy and persuaded his father to abdicate in his favour. As the historian Samuel Miklos Stern noted, "it is difficult to disentangle the legendary elements from the true facts" of Nizam al-Mulk's account, especially since the Fihrist does not mention a military plot, but has Nasr 'repenting' of his conversion, and al-Tha'alibi's account does not even have Nasr abdicating in favour of his son. Modern scholars consider that Nasr probably remained on his throne until his death on 6 April 943, and it is very likely that he died as an Isma'ili, but that a long illness forced him to withdraw from public affairs earlier than that.

Al-Tha'alibi reports that after Nasr's death and the accession of Nuh, the Isma'ilis tried to convert the new emir as well, but failed. According to Ibn al-Nadim, Nuh held a public theological debate, in which the Isma'ilis were defeated, but al-Tha'alibi contends that this happened in a private session, and that al-Nasafi's subsequent request for a public debate was denied. Shortly after, Nuh launched an anti-Isma'ili pogrom—according to Nizam al-Mulk, the troops spent seven days killing Isma'ili followers in Bukhara and its environs—in which al-Nasafi and many of his followers perished. Despite the implication of the medieval sources of a systematic anti-Isma'ili purge, this does not appear to have been the case, as several Isma'ili officials—including Ali Zarrad and Abu Mansur al-Shaghani—remained in their place during Nuh's reign.

Cultural affairs 
Nasr's ministers helped turn the Samanid court into a cultural center. Jayhani was known as an author and wrote a geographical work. His interest in the subject caused him to invite geographers from many places to Bukhara. Scientists, astronomers, and others also flocked to the city. Bal’ami likewise was interested in the arts and patronized intellectuals and authors.

References

Sources
 
 
 
  
 
 
 
 
 

Samanids
943 deaths
Medieval child monarchs
10th-century monarchs in the Middle East
Year of birth unknown
Amirs of Nishapur
10th-century Iranian people
Slave owners
Converts to Shia Islam from Sunni Islam
10th-century Ismailis
Iranian Ismailis